Senzao is a carbonated drink made with guarana by The Coca-Cola Company sold in Mexico. Guarana is a fruit which grows in Brazil.  In 2004 it was released for a limited time a Guarana-Orange flavor called Senzao Guaranaranja.

References

Coca-Cola brands
Mexican drinks